Events from the year 1916 in Denmark.

Incumbents
 Monarch – Christian X
 Prime minister – Carl Theodor Zahle

Events
 16 April – The adoption of Retsplejeloven introduces a major reform of the Danish judicial system with effect from 1 October 1919.
 4 August – the Treaty of the Danish West Indies is signed, transferring sovereignty of the Danish West Indies from Denmark to the United States. The transaction was finalised in 1917.

Sports

Date unknown
 B 93 wins the third Danish National Football Tournament by defeating Kjøbenhavns Boldklub 32 in the final

Births
 28 February – Svend Asmussen, jazz violinist (died 2017)
 27 April – Johannes Sløk, philosopher and writer (died 2001)
 14 August – Grethe Philip, politician (died 2016)

Deaths
13 February – Vilhelm Hammershøi, painter (born 1864)
 20 June – Christian Ditlev Ammentorp Hansen, pharmacist and industrialist (born 1843)
 22 July – Hans Jørgen Holm, architect (born 1835)

References

 
Denmark
Years of the 20th century in Denmark
1910s in Denmark
Denmark